Eucobresia glacialis is a species of gastropod belonging to the family Vitrinidae.

The species is found in Central Europe.

References

Vitrinidae